Thumak Chalat Ram Chandra is a bhajan (Hindu devotional song) written in the 16th century by the poet Goswami Tulsidas (गोस्वामी तुलसीदास). The bhajan glorifies Shri Rama and his characteristics during the childhood. Shri Tulsidasji describes Lord Rama's eyes, ears, and ornaments. He wants to compare Lord Rama's face with worldly wonders but couldn't find anything worthy enough so decides that the only thing comparable to Rama's face is Lord Rama's face itself.

Lyrics

Original Hindi lyrics

Transliteration (ISO 15919)

See also
 Hanuman Chalisa
 Shri Ramachandra Kripalu
 Ramcharitmanas
 Tulsidas

References

Hindu music
Vaishnavism
Bhakti movement
Bhajan
Hindu devotional songs